In mathematics, a Lie algebra is reductive if its adjoint representation is completely reducible, whence the name. More concretely, a Lie algebra is reductive if it is a direct sum of a semisimple Lie algebra and an abelian Lie algebra:  there are alternative characterizations, given below.

Examples 
The most basic example is the Lie algebra  of  matrices with the commutator as Lie bracket, or more abstractly as the endomorphism algebra of an n-dimensional vector space,  This is the Lie algebra of the general linear group GL(n), and is reductive as it decomposes as  corresponding to traceless matrices and scalar matrices.

Any semisimple Lie algebra or abelian Lie algebra is a fortiori reductive.

Over the real numbers, compact Lie algebras are reductive.

Definitions 
A Lie algebra  over a field of characteristic 0 is called reductive if any of the following equivalent conditions are satisfied:
  admits a faithful, completely reducible, finite-dimensional representation.
 The radical of  equals the center: 
The radical always contains the center, but need not equal it.
  is the direct sum of a semisimple ideal  and its center  
Compare to the Levi decomposition, which decomposes a Lie algebra as its radical (which is solvable, not abelian in general) and a Levi subalgebra (which is semisimple).
  is a direct sum of a semisimple Lie algebra  and an abelian Lie algebra : 
  is a direct sum of prime ideals: 
Some of these equivalences are easily seen.

Properties 
Reductive Lie algebras are a generalization of semisimple Lie algebras, and share many properties with them: many properties of semisimple Lie algebras depend only on the fact that they are reductive. Notably, the unitarian trick of Hermann Weyl works for reductive Lie algebras.

The associated reductive Lie groups are of significant interest: the Langlands program is based on the premise that what is done for one reductive Lie group should be done for all.

The intersection of reductive Lie algebras and solvable Lie algebras is exactly abelian Lie algebras (contrast with the intersection of semisimple and solvable Lie algebras being trivial).

External links 
 Lie algebra, reductive, A.L. Onishchik, in Encyclopaedia of Mathematics, SpringerLink

Properties of Lie algebras